The 1981 California Angels season involved the Angels finishing with the 5th best overall record in the American League West with 51 wins and 59 losses. The season was suspended for 50 days due to the infamous 1981 players' strike and the league chose as its playoff teams the division winners from the first and second halves of the season.

Offseason 
 December 2, 1980: Geoff Zahn was signed as a free agent by the Angels.
 December 8, 1980: Dan Whitmer was drafted from the Angels by the Toronto Blue Jays in the 1980 rule 5 draft.
 January 13, 1981: Ron Romanick was drafted by the California Angels in the 1st round (4th pick) of the 1981 amateur draft (Secondary Phase).
 January 23, 1981: Joe Rudi, Frank Tanana and Jim Dorsey were traded by the Angels to the Boston Red Sox for Fred Lynn and Steve Renko.
 February 2, 1981: Dave Rader was signed as a free agent by the Angels.
 February 2, 1981: Dave Skaggs was released by the Angels.

Regular season

Season standings

Record vs. opponents

Notable transactions 
 April 20, 1981: Dave Rader was released by the Angels.
 June 8, 1981: 1981 Major League Baseball draft
Dick Schofield was drafted by the Angels in the 1st round (3rd pick).
Devon White was drafted by the Angels in the 6th round. Player signed June 13, 1981.

Roster

Player stats

Batting

Starters by position 
Note: Pos = Position; G = Games played; AB = At bats; H = Hits; Avg. = Batting average; HR = Home runs; RBI = Runs batted in

Other batters 
Note: G = Games played; AB = At bats; H = Hits; Avg. = Batting average; HR = Home runs; RBI = Runs batted in

Pitching

Starting pitchers 
Note: G = Games pitched; IP = Innings pitched; W = Wins; L = Losses; ERA = Earned run average; SO = Strikeouts

Other pitchers 
Note: G = Games pitched; IP = Innings pitched; W = Wins; L = Losses; ERA = Earned run average; SO = Strikeouts

Relief pitchers 
Note: G = Games pitched; W = Wins; L = Losses; SV = Saves; ERA = Earned run average; SO = Strikeouts

Farm system

Notes

References

External links 
1981 California Angels at Baseball Reference
1981 California Angels  at Baseball Almanac

Los Angeles Angels seasons
California Angels season
Los